Emmanuelli is a French surname. Notable people with the surname include:

Henri Emmanuelli (1945–2017), French politician
Laurent Emmanuelli (born 1976), French rugby union player
Miguel Emmanuelli, Puerto Rican sports shooter

See also
Emmanuelle (name)

French-language surnames